Stempfferia tumentia, the swollen epitola, is a butterfly in the family Lycaenidae. The species was first described by Hamilton Herbert Druce in 1910. It is found in Nigeria (east and the Cross River loop), Cameroon, the Republic of the Congo, the Central African Republic and the Democratic Republic of the Congo. The habitat consists of forests.

References

Butterflies described in 1910
Poritiinae